Federation of Indian Export Organisations (FIEO) is the apex trade promotion organisation in India set up by the Ministry of Commerce, Government of India, and the private trade and industry segment in 1965. The organisation is responsible for representing and assisting Indian entrepreneurs and exporters in foreign markets.

Concept 
FIEO is the premier body of all export promotion councils, commodity boards, and export development authorities in India. It provides the crucial interface between international trading community of India and the central and state governments, financial institutions, ports, railways, surface transport and all others engaged in export trade facilitation. Directly and indirectly, it serves the interests of about  2,00,000 exporters from goods and services sector in the country.

As an ISO 9001:2015 certified organization, it ensures high quality service to its members, associates and stakeholders, who contribute to more than 70 percent of India’s exports.

As a close partner of the international trading community, it:

 facilitates the redressal of exporters’ problems by taking them up with the concerned authorities.
 provides opportunity to the exporters to discuss with FIEO experts on matters of international trade, seek clarification on policy matters and more.
 provides access to updated trade policies, links to global trade promotion organisations, and many more.
 organizes open house meets with the highest authorities to draw the attention of the government on important trade issues and help speedy resolution.

FIEO works in partnership with various academic institutions across the country to forge better academia-industry understanding to develop quality human resource to match the requirement of international trade. It organises specialised training/awareness programmes, seminars, workshops for export executives and entrepreneurs with the objective to develop entrepreneurship in international trade. It provides option to professionals and freshers to upload their resume on FIEO website, free access to members to this niche database of professionals and freshers with knowledge of international trade for recruitment purposes, and free option to members to upload, on FIEO website, the job vacancies arising in their companies.

Indian Trade Portal 
FIEO developed and maintains the Indian Trade Portal website to keep members updated about trade policy matters and provide assistance. Internationally, FIEO establishes MoUs with counterpart organisations, arranges exhibitions and catalog shows. It is a partner of the Enterprise Europe Network. A month news magazine is published about trade and commerce, with worldwide readership among exporters and importers, international agencies, policy makers, and other stakeholders. Weekly and monthly e-bulletins are also published.

Ease of Logistics Portal 
Shri Piyush Goyal, Union Commerce & Industry, Consumer Affairs & Public Distribution and Textiles Minister on 27 September 2021 launched a trade facilitation portal www.easeoflogistics.com developed by FIEO to bring exporters and logistics service providers (LSPs) on a single platform. Exporters can post details of their container requirements directly to service providers for providing their best quotes, enabling exporters to chat, negotiate and finalize business.

Mobile app 
On 8 August 2018, Suresh Prabhu, the then Commerce and Industry Minister launched the Niryat Mitra application. The application gives the users access to FIEO's monthly and weekly publications, event calendar, online event registration, information articles, press releases, research publications, and other important announcements. Members can create a company profile on the application, and receive daily updates on policy, preferential tariff, MFN status, SPS / TBT measures, identify tariff lines, applicable GST rates, export incentives, and more.

Recognition 
FIEO confers the Niryat Shree and Niryat Bandhu awards to its exporters and export facilitators for their outstanding performance in exports. It also confers the Export Excellence Awards to the members of the respective regions.

References

External links 

Onion exporter in india

1965 establishments in Delhi
Foreign trade of India
Government agencies established in 1965
Export promotion agencies of India